is a railway station in Karatsu, Saga Prefecture, Japan. It is operated by Kyushu Railway Company (JR Kyushu).

This station is a terminal station of the Karatsu Line, including trains from the Chikuhi Line.

Layout
The station is ground level with a single side platform.

Adjacent stations

Environs
JR Kyushu Karatsu Railway Division Karatsu transportation center
Nishi-Karatsu Post Office
Karatsu Police Station
Kyushu Electric Power Karatsu Thermal power station

History
October 11, 1905 - Renamed to present name.
August 1982 - The present station building is completed.
March 22, 1983 - Electrification of the track between Meinohama Station and Nishi-Karatsu Station is completed.
April 1, 1987 - Railways privatize and JR Kyushu inherits this station.

Passenger statistics
In fiscal 2016, the station was used by an average of 502 passengers daily (boarding passengers only), and it ranked 246th  among the busiest stations of JR Kyushu.

References

External links
 Nishi-Karatsu Station (JR Kyushu) 

Railway stations in Saga Prefecture
Railway stations in Japan opened in 1898